The cedar waxwing (Bombycilla cedrorum) is a member of the family Bombycillidae or waxwing family of passerine birds. It is a medium-sized, mostly brown, gray, and yellow. This bird is named for its wax-like wing tips. It is a native of North and Central America, breeding in open wooded areas in southern Canada and wintering in the southern half of the United States, Central America, and the far northwest of South America. Its diet includes cedar cones, fruit, holly berries, and insects. The cedar waxwing is listed as least concern on the IUCN Red List.

The genus name Bombycilla comes from the Ancient Greek bombux, "silk" and the Modern Latin cilla, "tail"; this is a direct translation of the German Seidenschwanz, "silk-tail", and refers to the silky-soft plumage of these birds. The specific cedrorum is Latin for "of the cedars".

Description

Wingspan ranges from 8.7-11.8 in (22-30 cm). They are smaller and browner than their close relative, the Bohemian waxwing (which breeds farther to the north and west). Their markings are a "silky, shiny collection of brown, gray, and lemon-yellow, accented with a subdued crest, rakish black mask, and brilliant-red wax droplets on the wing feathers." These droplets may be the same color as the madrone berries they are known to eat. These birds' most prominent feature is this small cluster of red wax-like droplets on tips of secondary flight feathers on the wings, a feature they share with the Bohemian waxwing (but not the Japanese waxwing). These wax-like droplets are attributed to the pigmented and medullary layers of the secondary tip being surrounded by a transparent cuticle. The wings are "broad and pointed, like a starling's." The tail is typically yellow or orange depending on diet. Birds that have fed on berries of introduced Eurasian honeysuckles while growing tail feathers will have darker orange-tipped tail-feathers. The tail is somewhat short, and square-tipped. Adults have a pale yellow belly. The waxwing's crest often "lies flat and droops over the back of the head." It has a short and wide bill. The waxwing's black mask has a thin white border. Immature birds are streaked on the throat and flanks, and often do not have the black mask of the adults. Males and females look alike.

The flight of waxwings is strong and direct, and the movement of the flock in flight resembles that of a flock of small pale European starlings.

The oldest observed cedar waxwing was eight years and two months old.

Vocalizations
The two common calls of these birds include very high-pitched whistles and buzzy trills about a half second long often represented as see or sree. Its call can also be described as "high, thin, whistles." They call often, especially in flight.

Distribution and habitat

Preferred habitat consists of trees at the edge of wooded areas, or forests, especially those that provide access to berry sources as well as water. They are frequently seen in fruiting trees. Waxwings are attracted to the sound of running water and like to bathe in and drink from shallow creeks. In urban or suburban environments, waxwings often favor parkland with well-spaced trees;
golf courses, cemeteries, or other landscaping with well-spaced trees; bushes that provide berries; and a nearby water source such as a fountain or birdbath. Also look for them near farms, orchards, and gardens, particularly ones with fruiting trees or shrubs.

Outside the breeding season, cedar waxwings often feed in large flocks numbering hundreds of birds. This species is nomadic and irruptive, with erratic winter movements, though most of the population migrates farther south into the United States and beyond, sometimes reaching as far as northern South America. They will move in huge numbers if berry supplies are low. Rare vagrants have reached western Europe, and there are two recorded occurrences of cedar waxwing sightings in Great Britain. Individual Bohemian waxwings will occasionally join large winter flocks of cedar waxwings.

Behavior and ecology
Cedar waxwings are sociable, seen in flocks year round. They are non-territorial birds and "will often groom each other." They move from place to place depending on where they can find good sources of berries.

Breeding

Mating season for this bird begins around the end of spring and runs through late summer. The male will do a "hopping dance" for the female. If she is interested, she'll hop back. During courtship the male and female will sit together and pass small objects back and forth, such as flower petals or an insect. Mating pairs will sometimes rub their beaks together. It takes around five or six days for the female waxwing to build the nest and can take up to 2,500 trips back and forth. Sometimes the female will steal nest material from other species' nests. Usually 5 or 6 eggs are laid and the female incubates them for 11 to 13 days. The eggs are oval shaped with a smooth surface and very little, if any, gloss. The egg shells are of various shades of light or bluish grey with irregular, dark brown spots or greyish-brown splotches. Both parents build the nest and feed the young. Typically, there are one or two broods during the mating season. Young leave the nest about 14 to 18 days after hatching.

Diet

Cedar waxwings eat berries and sugary fruit year-round, including dogwood, serviceberry, cedar, juniper, hawthorn, and winterberry, with insects becoming an important part of the diet in the breeding season. Its fondness for the small cones of the eastern redcedar (a kind of juniper) gave this bird its common name. They eat berries whole. They sometimes fly over water to catch insects. The cedar waxwing is sometimes responsible for significant damage to commercial fruit farms and thus can be considered a pest, especially because it feeds in large groups.

When the end of a twig holds a supply of berries that only one bird at a time can reach, members of a flock may line up along the twig and pass berries beak to beak down the line so that each bird gets a chance to eat.

Sometimes, cedar waxwings will eat fruit that is overripe and has begun to ferment, intoxicating the bird.

Digestion
Cedar waxwings are a highly specialized frugivorous species, exhibiting almost full reliance on sugary fruits, unlike other fruit-eating passerines that exhibit only opportunistic frugivory when other food sources are in poor supply. Their efficient digestion of fruits containing simple sugars allows them to persist off of fruit alone, while other fruit-eating passerines found subsisting on fruit alone to be a fatal task. Reliance on primarily fruit alone occurs until fruit cessation in the spring when the birds start to feed on insects and flowers in which an intestinal analysis revealed stomach contents of 84% fruit, 12% invertebrates, and 4% flowers, among 212 individuals involved in the study.

Despite the advantage of frugivorous specialization, they did lose body mass when experimentally fed one fruit type alone (Viburnum opulus), but gained body mass when fed pollen-rich catkins as well (Populus deltoides). Many fleshy fruits are energy rich, however, they are deficient in nitrogen (protein) levels required by cedar waxwings (1.7%). The nutrient deficit of sugary fruits alone is mitigated through flower and subsequent pollen consumption that is rich in protein. This response to food diversity illustrates the importance of multiple food sources in order to acquire the precise nutrients needed to maintain bodily metabolism. 

Even though they displayed efficient rates of digestion, they also exhibited relatively quick passage rates which are indicative of their low utilization efficiency (36.5%) as fruit skins appeared undigested in feces. The low utilization efficiency of fruits digested by Cedar Waxwings not only indicates the necessity of consuming large quantities of fruits, but viable seeds found in feces also suggests the important role they may play in seed dispersal.

The presence of seeds in feces is also indicative of the digestive limitations associated with eating seed-rich fruits, specifically fruits laden with smaller seeds that pass much slower through the digestive tract. A positive correlation between seed defecation and fruit consumption is seen as rates of ingestion increased only when rates of seed processing also increased. Studies have shown that when seeds were observed being regurgitated or expelled, activity and ingestion increased as opposed to when seeds were consumed and passed through the digestive tract, limiting further activity and foraging in which waxwings exhibited a period of “loafing” characterized by stretches of inactivity after a meal. This limitation of fruit processing poses potential issues for Cedar Waxwings observed consuming nutrient-poor fruits and their seeds as the ingestion of seeds prevents them from increasing consumption efforts to mitigate this low-quality diet.
 
Ingestion of seeds by cedar waxwings is alleviated via efficient rates of seed processing in which seeds are separated from and defecated before the pulp of the fruit. This allows them to still exhibit relatively high digestion efficiencies in spite of the gut processing limitations that are associated with eating seeds. The digestive strategies employed by these birds allow them to subside off of a predominately fruit-based diet.

Conservation status
Waxwings are evaluated as Least Concern on the IUCN Red List of Endangered Species. Populations are increasing in their range partly because fields are being allowed to grow into forests and shrublands, and fruiting trees like mountain ash are being planted as landscaping. On the other hand, cedar waxwings do sometimes crash into windows, and get hit by cars while foraging along roadsides.

References

External links

Cedar waxwing - Bombycilla cedrorum - USGS Patuxent Bird Identification InfoCenter
General info, including photos and videos, with specific sites for finding cedar waxwings in San Diego County, California
Stamps at bird-stamps.org

cedar waxwing
Birds of North America
Birds of Canada
Birds of the United States
cedar waxwing
cedar waxwing
Extant Pleistocene first appearances